Another Peaceful Day of Second-Hand Items / Nara's Marvelous Days  is a South Korean web series. A production of KODA (Korea Drama Producers Association), it is set to air on Naver TV Cast and V Live on January 21, 2021. It stars Gugudan's Hana, Lee Ka-eun and Kang Tae-joo.

Synopsis
The drama tells the story of people who buy and sell secondhand items online. A woman was dumped by her long-term boyfriend and thought that she was "secondhand item" in dating. Another love story begins when she meets a man who helps her realize the value of things that are second-hand.

Cast

Main
 Hana as Shin Na-ra
 Lee Ka-eun as Lee Ri-ah
 Kang Tae-joo as Yoo Eun-ho

References

South Korean drama web series
2020 web series debuts
2020 web series endings
Naver TV original programming